Maersk Line is a Danish international container shipping company and the largest operating subsidiary of the Maersk Group, a Danish business conglomerate. Founded in 1928, it is the world's largest container shipping company by both fleet size and cargo capacity, offering regular services to 374 ports in 116 countries. In 2019, it employed 83,625 people where 18,398 of which are vessel crew and the other 65,227 are processing and operations personnel in offices and ports.

Maersk Line operates over 708 vessels and has a total capacity of about 4.1 million TEU.

History
At the beginning of the 1920s, A.P. Moller considered possibilities of going into liner trade business. The tramp trade, where vessels sailed from port to port depending on the demand, was expected to lose ground to liners in time. On 12 July 1928, the vessel Leise Mærsk left Baltimore on its first voyage from the American East Coast via the Panama Canal to the Far East and back. The cargo consisted of Ford car parts and other general cargo. This heralded the start of Maersk's shipping services. Maersk Line began to grow in 1946 after the Second World War by transporting goods between America and Europe before expanding services in 1950. In 1967, British carrier P&O was part of the first European initiative, a pooling of liner services from four companies, into the new company Overseas Containers Limited (OCL). Both Sea-land and P&O would later be taken over by Maersk Line as it expanded operations between 1999 and 2005.

In 1999, Maersk entered into an agreement on acquisition of Safmarine Container Lines (SCL) and its related liner activities from South African Marine Corporation Limited (Safmarine). At the time of acquisition, Safmarine Container Lines operated approximately 50 liner vessels and a fleet of about 80,000 containers. It covered a total of ten trades and fully complemented Maersk Line's existing network. Safmarine Container Lines joined the A.P. Moller – Maersk Group as an independent unit with its own liner activities.

On 10 December 1999, the A.P. Moller Group acquired the international container business of SeaLand Service Inc. The business was integrated with the A.P. Moller Group companies and as part of the integration, Maersk Line changed its name to Maersk Sealand. The acquisition comprised 70 vessels, almost 200,000 containers as well as terminals, offices and agencies around the world.

In May 2005 Maersk announced plans to purchase P&O Nedlloyd for 2.3 billion euros. At the time of the acquisition, P&O Nedlloyd had 6% of the global industry market share, and Maersk-Sealand had 12%. The combined company would be about 18% of world market share. Maersk completed the buyout of the company on 13 August 2005, Royal P&O Nedlloyd shares terminated trading on 5 September. In February 2006, the new combined entity adopted the name Maersk Line.

At the time the company was folded into A.P. Moller, it owned and chartered a fleet of over 160 vessels. Royal P&O Nedlloyd N.V. had 13,000 employees in 146 countries.

By the end of 2006, Maersk global market share had fallen from 18.2% to 16.8%, at the same time, the next two largest carriers increased their market share, MSC went from 8.6% to 9.5% and CMA CGM from 5.6% to 6.5%. In January 2008, Maersk Line announced drastic reorganisational measures.

In November 2015, after lower than expected results, Maersk Line announced its decision to lay off 4000 employees by 2017. The group said it would cut its annual administration costs by $250 million over the next two years and would cancel 35 scheduled voyages in the fourth quarter of 2015 on top of four regularly scheduled sailings it canceled earlier in the year.

As of October 2015, Maersk Line along with its subsidiaries such as Seago, MCC, Safmarine and SeaLand, control a combined 18% share of the total container shipping market.

Since 1 December 2017, Hamburg Süd had been part of the company.

In March 2021, Maersk announced that is aiming to have the world's first carbon neutral vessel launched in 2023, seven years ahead of its original schedule. In August of that year, the company purchased eight methanol powered shipping vessels for $1.4 billion from Hyundai Heavy Industries.

Since 2023 unified Maersk presentation presence.

2M Alliance: Maersk/MSC 
In 2015, Maersk and Mediterranean Shipping Co. (MSC) launched the 2M Alliance, a vessel-sharing agreement on the Asia-Europe, trans-Pacific and trans-Atlantic trades. The arrangement, which includes a series of slot exchanges and slot purchases on east–west routes, also involves Maersk Line and MSC taking over a number of charters and operations of vessels chartered to HMM. The 2M Alliance include 185 vessels with an estimated capacity of 2.1 million TEU, deployed on 21 strings.

Sustainability
In 2011–12, Maersk Line cooperated with the US Navy on testing between 7 and 100% algae biofuel on Maersk Kalmar. From 2007 to 2014, and mainly due to slow steaming, Maersk Line reduced its CO2 emissions by 40% or 11 million tonnes, about the same reduction as the rest of Denmark.

Maersk set a goal in December 2018 to be carbon neutral by 2050. In 2017, the company's ships emitted 35.5 million tonnes of CO2e, and it hopes to eliminate that by using biofuels to power its fleet. In 2022, Maersk ordered 12 dual-fuel container ships from Hyundai by 2025, capable of sailing on both fossil bunker fuel and methanol.

Services
Maersk Line is best known for its vast coverage across the globe. Other than its main trade lanes of Asia-Europe and Trans-Atlantic trades, Maersk Line also offers extensive coverage between South America and Europe as well as to Africa. The company also pioneered the innovative concept of Daily Maersk in 2011 which provided a premium guaranteed service between supply ports of China and European base ports. Despite support from the trade, Maersk Line was forced to cut down services due to oversupply. Recent restructuring of its products have included upgrades to their Asia to Australia, India to West Africa, and China to America routes.

Other than those main trade routes, Maersk Line also operates many continental trade lines. It operates in its Intra-Asia route through MCC Transport, its European route through Seago Lines, and recently re-launched the famous SeaLand Service brand for its American trade lanes.

Fleet
As of July 2011, the Maersk Line fleet comprises more than 700 vessels (with Hamburg Süd and Safmarine combined) and a multitude of containers corresponding to more than 3.8 million TEU (twenty-foot equivalent unit)

In 2006, the E-class vessel Emma Maersk, was delivered to Maersk Line from Odense Steel Shipyard. It was by far, the largest container ship in the world at the time.

Seven other sister ships have since been built, and in 2011, Maersk ordered 20 even larger container ships from Daewoo, the Triple E class, each with a capacity of 18,000 containers. The first of these Triple E Class ships was delivered on June 14, 2013, and was christened with the name Mærsk Mc-Kinney Møller after the son of the founder of the Maersk Line.

The following ship classes are part of the Maersk Line fleet:

Accidents and incidents

Marit Maersk 
This 3,330-ton, 314-foot freighter was built in 1938 at Fredrikstad, Norway. She was commissioned as a naval transport for the Royal Hellenic Navy through the Hellenic Maritime Commission in London on 27 November 1940. Used as a support ship for the armored cruiser Giorgios Averoff in 1942-44, Marit Maersk was returned to her owners on 14 November 1945. In 1954 she was sold to Greek owners and renamed Belgium.

Maersk Alabama 
The siege ended after a rescue effort by the United States Navy on 12 April.

Emma Maersk 
On 1 February 2013, the container ship Emma Maersk suffered a damaged stern thruster and took on so much water in the Suez Canal that she became unmaneuverable. Tugs, anchors and the wind took her to Port Said to offload 13,500 containers, drain her and be investigated by divers. She had not been in danger of sinking.

On 15 February 2013, the Maersk Line confirmed that she was about to leave Port Said under tow to a yard for further assessment and repair. On 25 February she reached the yard of Palermo, Sicily, where she was scheduled to stay for four months. The flooded engine was disassembled, repaired and assembled, and in August 2013, she was in service again after a DKK 250 million (roughly US$44.5m) repair.

Maersk Honam 
It took more than 3 days to get the fire under control and the ship continued to burn for several more weeks. The ship was salvaged and the damaged parts of the vessel were rebuilt. The ship was renamed Maersk Halifax before entering into service again.

Maersk Roubaix 
On 21 December 2021, the container ship Maersk Roubaix suffered from engine issues and became adrift in the Mediterranean  370 kilometres from Malta, while it was en route to the port of Algeciras in Spain. A tugboat was dispatched to assist.

Mumbai Maersk 
On on 2 February 2022, container ship Mumbai Maersk run aground near the Port of Bremerhaven in Germany. A first attempt to tow the container ship into deeper water two multi-purpose vessels and five tugboats failed. On 4 February, the ship was refloated with the help of eight tugboats. A vessel assessment was done when she arrived at the Port of Bremerhaven.

See also
 A.P. Moller – Maersk Group
 List of largest container ships

References

Notes

Bibliography

External links

Container Tracking

 
Shipping companies of Denmark
Container shipping companies
Danish companies established in 1928
Transport companies established in 1928